University of the Punjab, Gujranwala Campus (also referred to as Punjab University Gujranwala campus or PUGC) is a satellite campus of University of the Punjab, Lahore which is located in Gujranwala, Punjab, Pakistan. It is the third-oldest campus amongst the five University of the Punjab campuses. The university occupies 81 kanals (approx. 10.03 acres) located near the Ali Pur Chowk, Rawalpindi bypass, Gujranwala. The University offers undergraduate, graduate and post graduate programs in six main departments.

Degrees offered 

 Department of Commerce
 M.Phil. (Commerce)
 M.Com. (Hons.) 1.5 years
 M.Com. (Hons.) 3.5 years
 B.Com. (Hons.)
 Department of Business Administration
 MBA Executive
 MBA (Hons.) 1.5 years
 BBA (Hons.)
 Post Graduate Diploma in Business Administration
 Department of Banking & Finance
 BBA (Hons.) Banking & Finance
 Department of Information Technology
 BS Information Technology
 BS Computer Science
 BS Software Engineering
 Department of Law
 LLB (Hons.)
 Department of English
 M.A English

Societies at PUGC 
PUGC Society of Computer Science
PUGC Sports Society
PUGC Debating Society
PUGC Character Building Society
PUGC Event Management Society
PUGC Art and Design Society
PUGC Alumni Association

See also 
Gujranwala 
GIFT University 
University of the Punjab 
Government College Gujranwala

References

External links 

 PUGC official website
 University of the Punjab main campus official website
 Society in PUGC

University of the Punjab
Public universities and colleges in Punjab, Pakistan
Universities and colleges in Gujranwala District
Education in Gujranwala